Nels Swandal is an American politician. He is a former Republican member of the Montana Senate, where he represented District 30, including Wilsall, Montana.

References

Living people
People from Park County, Montana
Republican Party Montana state senators
Year of birth missing (living people)